William Bartlett Fletcher Sr. (1862 – June 29, 1957) was a Rear Admiral in the United States Navy.

Biography
He was born in 1862. He had a son, William Bartlett Fletcher Jr. (1900–1980).

He took over command of the USS Birmingham from Captain Burns Tracy Walling, the ship's first commander on October 28, 1909 and served till 1910.

He died on June 29, 1957 at the Naval Hospital in St. Albans, Queens, New York City.

References

1862 births
1957 deaths
United States Navy rear admirals